Devario apopyris is a freshwater fish endemic to northern Laos. It is currently only known from its type locality in the Nam Youan watershed (Mekong basin); its true range is likely to extend into Yunnan, China. It grows to  standard length.

References

Devario
Cyprinid fish of Asia
Fish of the Mekong Basin
Fish of Laos
Endemic fauna of Laos
Taxa named by Fang Fang Kullander
Taxa named by Maurice Kottelat
Fish described in 1999